Hüseyin Nazım Pasha (1848 – 23 January 1913) was an Ottoman general, who was the Chief of Staff of the Ottoman Army during the First Balkan War of 1912–13. He was murdered by Yakub Cemil during the 1913 Ottoman coup d'état.

Career 
He was a staunch supporter of the French Offensive Doctrine, developed primarily by Ferdinand Foch, his instructor at the Saint-Cyr Military Academy and later supreme commander of Allied forces on the Western Front of World War I. Following his appointment as a Chief of Staff, he made immediate changes to Ottoman military doctrine which had been created by Colmar Freiherr von der Goltz (Goltz Pasha), the German officer who had been in charge of the reorganisation and training of the Ottoman Army. Goltz Pasha's doctrine dictated that, in case of war with Balkan states, Ottoman forces would remain on the defensive, both on the western (Vardar) and eastern (Thracian) approaches.

Nazım Pasha abandoned Goltz Pasha's defensive (and probably realistic) doctrine and, though the Ottoman army had severe problems in mobilizing its troops (assembling fewer than half of the expected 600,000 troops), developed a bold offensive plan, including offensive operations on both fronts. Because the Serbian army was, after its defeat in the Serbo-Bulgarian War, considered a weaker opponent even by Western observers, Nazım Pasha planned to attack it first, and render it operationally incapable. He would then attack Bulgaria (which was considered the strongest link in the Balkan alliance) from both the Macedonian and Thracian directions. His underestimation of Serbian strength led to the complete failure of his operational plan and the catastrophe which followed.

He was assassinated by the Committee of Union and Progress on 23 January 1913 during the 1913 Ottoman coup d'état. In retaliation, one of his relatives avenged his death by assassinating the Committee's Grand Vizier, Mahmud Shevket Pasha, on 11 June 1913.

References 

1913 deaths
Ottoman Military Academy alumni
Ottoman Military College alumni
Ottoman Army generals
Pashas
Ottoman military personnel of the Balkan Wars
Government ministers of the Ottoman Empire
Assassinated people from the Ottoman Empire
1848 births